The Omega Bank was a Greek banking service until it was bought by Proton Bank in  October 2006.  The bank was named after the last letter of the Greek alphabet (see omega).

See also

List of banks in Greece

External links
 Bank's homepage(Now diverts to the homepage of Proton Bank

Defunct banks of Greece
Banks established in 2001
Greek companies established in 2001